Heinen is a Dutch and Low German patronymic surname meaning "son of Hein". Notable people with the surname include:

Bregje Heinen (born 1993), Dutch model
Danton Heinen (born 1995), Canadian ice hockey player
Dirk Heinen (born 1970), German football goalkeeper
Gabriele Heinen-Kljajic (born 1962), German politician for the Alliance 90/The Greens
 (1941–2013), Belgian-German historian of antiquity
João Pedro Heinen (born 1997), Brazilian football midfielder
Josef Heinen (1929–1988), German sprinter
Mike Heinen (born 1967), American golfer
Nancy R. Heinen (born 1956), American lawyer and Apple Inc. executive

See also
Heinen's Fine Foods
Heijnen, Dutch variant spelling of the surname
Heine, German variant spelling of the surname

References

Dutch-language surnames
Low German surnames
Patronymic surnames